Gram-negative rosacea is a cutaneous condition that clinically looks like stage II or III rosacea.

See also
 List of cutaneous conditions

References

Acneiform eruptions